José de Jesús del Muro López (30 November 1937 – 4 October 2022) was a Mexican football coach and player.

During his career he played as a defender for Atlas (1954–1965), Veracruz (1965), Cruz Azul (1966 and 1971) and Toluca (1969 and 1973).

In 1958 he became a member of the Mexico national team, and went on to three FIFA World Cup tournaments: 1958, 1962, and 1966, appearing in seven final tournament matches as well as two qualification matches. His 40th and last international match was in 1968.

Del Muro retired in 1973 and became a coach, managing Toluca (1972–1973), Pachuca (1973), Jalisco (1974–75) and Cruz Azul, coaching the latter for the last time in 1997. He was an assistant coach for Mexico national team at 1978 World Cup, and coach of the FIFA U-20 World Cup (FIFA World Youth Championship) (1977–78 and 1980), the Mexico U17 (1987–88 and 1995–97) and the U20 national teams (1984–86, 1995 and 1998–2000).

References

External links
FIFA.com - Individual record at FIFA tournaments

1937 births
2022 deaths
Mexican footballers
Footballers from Guadalajara, Jalisco
Association football defenders
Mexico international footballers
1958 FIFA World Cup players
1962 FIFA World Cup players
1966 FIFA World Cup players
Liga MX players
Atlas F.C. footballers
C.D. Veracruz footballers
Cruz Azul footballers
Deportivo Toluca F.C. players
Mexican football managers
Cruz Azul managers
c.F. Pachuca managers